Drimia secunda (syn. Rhadamanthus secundus) is a species of plant that is endemic to Namibia.  Its natural habitats are rocky areas and cold desert.

References

 

Flora of Namibia
Scilloideae
Least concern plants
Taxonomy articles created by Polbot
Taxobox binomials not recognized by IUCN